Hur (meaning "free", "not slave" ) is a Sunni Sufi Muslim community in the province of Sindh, Pakistan. Their spiritual leader is Pir Pagaro who resisted British rule in Sindh.

History of the Hur Movement
During the period of colonial rule on the Indian subcontinent, Pir Pagaro declared his community "Hur" (free).  The colonial government tried to suppress the movement and that resulted in an armed insurgency by Hurs. The Criminal Tribes Act of 1871 was recommended in Sindh upon disciples of Pir Pagaro in 1898 by Sardar Mohammad Yaqub during his days as Commissioner. This law was imposed on Sindh in 1900 by virtue of the actions of Pagaro's disciples. This law remained on the disciples throughout up to 1952. But during the 1941 to 1946 the colonial government passed many laws, one of them called "Hur Suppression Act" passed hastily by Sindh Assembly in May 1942, ultimately imposing martial law from June 1942 to the end of May 1943. After lifting of Martial Law in 1943, again many laws were arbitrarily made virtually keeping the laws that had been made for military rule—these rules were in addition to the Defence of India Rules. By virtue of all these Acts and Rules, the entire Hur community was virtually criminalised. This community had been declared Criminal Tribe" in the year 1900. During the period of martial law, the colonial army patrolled the area and dealt with suspected followers of Pir Pagaro firmly. This caused the Hurs to carry out more acts such as causing the derailment of the Lahore Mail train in 1942, which resulted in the deaths of 22 people.

The Hurs cannot be said to have been defeated as they continued their campaign even after the hanging of the Pir Sahib, right up to the time of the independence of Sindh, Sindh having acquired the status of an independent country. Pir Pagaro Sayyed Sibghatullah Shah II was hanged on 20 March 1943 and the British left Pakistan four years later on 14 August 1947. Long after the independence of Pakistan, Pir Pagaro's two sons, who were in British custody in England, were released and came back to lead their community.  Sindh was a province in the newly independent Sindh. The two sons of Sibghatullah Shah II Shaheed, Pir Syed Shah Mardan Shah Rashidi alais Pir Syed Sikandar Ali Shah Rashidi and Pir Syed Nadir Ali Shah Rashdi were brought to Pakistan in December 1951 after long negotiations. The elder son, Pir Syed Shah Mardan Shah Rashidi - II alais Pir Syed Sikandar Ali Shah Rashdi became the new Pir Pagara (7th Pir Pagaro) on 1 February 1952. Shah Mardan Shah II died on 10 January 2012 in london due to Pnuemunia. On 12 January 2012, Syed Sibghatullah Shah Rashdi III, commonly known as Raja Saein, was elected as the 8th Pir Pagara at a meeting of the Caliphs of Hur Community.

Hurs in the 1965 War 
During the 1965 war between India and Pakistan, Hur fought for Pakistan in the leadership of Ghazi Hur Mujahid Faqeer Arbelo Katpar.

List of Pir Pagaros
 Syed Muhammad Rashid Shah (Rozay Dhani, forerunner of Pir Pagaras and Jhandaywaras), died 1819
 Syed Sibghatullah Shah I (First Pir Pagaro, because of getting the pagg, or turban, while his brother Yaseen Shah got the Jhanda, 'Alam), died in 1831
 Pir Syed Ali Gohar Shah Rashidi - I (2nd Pir Pagaro), died in 1847. Collection of his Poetry Asghar Sain jo Kalam is published by Jamia Rashidia Pir jo Goth.
 Syed Hizbullah Shah (Third Pir Pagaro), died in 1890
 Syed Ali Gohar Shah II (Fourth Pir Pagaro), died in 1896
 Syed Shah Mardan Shah I  (Fifth Pir Pagaro), died in 1921
 Sibghatullah Shah Rashidi II alias Soreh Badshah سورھيه بادشاھ (Sixth Pir Pagaro), died on 20 March 1943
 Shah Mardan Shah II alias Pir Syed Sikandar Ali Shah Rashidi (Seventh Pir Pagaro), died on 10 January 2012. 
 Syed Sibghatullah Shah Rashdi III alias Raja Saeen (Eighth Pir Pagaro)

See also 
 Shah Mardan Shah II
 Pir Pagaro

References

 History of Indo-Pak War of 1965. Lt Gen Mahmud Ahmed (ret). 

Denotified tribes of India
Social groups of Pakistan
Sufism in Pakistan